CIAU-FM is a French-language community radio station that operates at 103.1 FM in Radisson, Quebec, Canada.

Owned by Radio communautaire de Radisson, the station received CRTC approval in 1997.

The station is a member of the Association des radiodiffuseurs communautaires du Québec.

References

External links
www.ciaufm.ca
 

Iau
Iau
Iau
Radio stations established in 1997
1997 establishments in Quebec